Operation Rooster 53 was an Israeli military operation during the War of Attrition to capture an Egyptian P-12 radar system. Often referred to as merely Operation Rooster, it was carried out on December 26 and 27, 1969. Participating forces including the Nahal Brigade's 50th battalion, the elite paratrooper reconnaissance unit Sayeret Tzanhanim, and the Israeli Air Force.

Background
The War of Attrition raged along the Suez Canal, as Egypt attempted to recapture the Sinai Peninsula, which Israel had conquered during the Six-Day War. Egypt had received a considerable amount of military equipment, including tanks, radar systems and weapons, from the Soviet Union. During the Six-Day War, Israel had captured some of these shipments of equipment, which had allowed it to gain a lot of intelligence on the weaknesses of the Egyptian air defense. As newer systems arrived in Egypt, Israel had an effort underway to learn how to deal with these. Reconnaissance missions showed that a P-12 radar system had been placed on the beach of Ras Gharib. An attempt to destroy it with an aerial strike was cancelled.

Planning
Planning of the mission started on December 24. It received approval from the IDF chain of command and training began on radar systems which had been captured during the Six-Day War. Sikorsky CH-53 helicopters were chosen to carry the radar to Israeli territory.

Execution of the mission
The mission was launched at 9 p.m. on December 26. A-4 Skyhawks and F-4 Phantoms began attacking Egyptian forces along the western bank of the Suez canal and Red Sea. Hidden by the noise of the attacking jets, three Aérospatiale Super Frelons, carrying a force from the 35th Paratroopers Brigade, led by Lieutenant colonel Arie Sidon and his deputy Doron Rubin, made their way west towards their target. Making their approach carefully in order not to be spotted beforehand, the paratroopers overwhelmed the light security contingent at the radar installation and quickly took control of the site. By 2 a.m., on December 27, when the paratroops had taken apart the radar station and prepared the various parts for the CH-53s, the two helicopters were called in from across the Red Sea. One CH-53 carried the communications caravan and the radar antenna, while the other took the heavier, four-ton radar itself. The two helicopters made their way back across the Red Sea to Israeli controlled territory.

References

Operation “Rooster”— Israel Captures Egyptian Radar In War of Attrition in Jewish Virtual Library.  Retrieved October 30, 2005.

Conflicts in 1969
1969 in Egypt
Rooster 53
Aerial operations and battles involving Israel
War of Attrition
1969 in the Israeli Military Governorate
December 1969 events in Asia
December 1969 events in Africa